Sean Burch (born June 8, 1972) is an American explorer, leadership performance specialist, and filmmaker. He is author of the book, Hyperfitness:  12 Weeks to Reaching Your Inner Everest and Getting into the Best Shape of Your Life (Penguin Random House). He holds 8 World Records within fitness and adventure, and was winner of National Geographic Channel’s Ultimate Survival Alaska TV show.  Burch is the creator and founder of Hyperfitness, a wellness program. He was named Goodwill Ambassador to Nepal by their country's government. He resides within the Washington DC area.

Film making career
Burch began filming his expeditions in 2003 on Mount Everest as a way to record his solo expeditions in remote regions around the world. His documentary film, The Icefall Doctor on the original Icefall Doctor of the Khumbu Icefall on Mount Everest completed post-production in late 2021. Burch serves as a producer, director, and cinematographer. Sean Burch - IMDb This film as been featured in numerous film festivals around the world, winning Best Film in the Torello Mountain Film Festival in Spain in 2022  and Best Film Mountains, Sports, & Adventure at Slovenia's largest film festival Festival Gorniskega Filma  in 2023.

His second film of a 3-part series on The Icefall Doctors of Mount Everest is a short film Samdo Sherpa, based on one family’s lives which interweave under Everest’s shadow. The matriarch Samdo Sherpa moved to Kathmandu after her husband’s Angnima Sherpa premature death to become a Buddhist nun in a monastery.

Filmography

Ascents and Expeditions of Note
 2000: Wrangell–St. Elias National Park, Alaska, First Ascents (3) of previously unclimbed mountain peaks 
 2001: Shishapangma, Tibet, reached summit with Dan Mazur
 2002: Aconcagua, Argentina fastest American Ascent
 2002: East Greenland First Ascents (14) in Gronau Nunatakker region
 2003: Mount Everest, Nepal
 2004: North Pole Marathon, first place
 2005: Mount Kilimanjaro, summit in 5 hours, 28 minutes and 48 seconds
 2006: First ascents (63) of Mountain Peaks in 23 days, solo, Tibet
 2009: Winter Ascent of Mount Fuji, Japan
 2010: Crossed Nepal via Himalaya Range from India Border to Tibet Border
 2014: First Ascents (23) of Previously Unclimbed Mountains, solo, in Mongolia
 2016: First Ascents (31) in 21 days, solo, Nepal

Photojournalism and videography
 (2003) USA Today "Mount Everest Climber Returns Somewhat Intact"
 (2005) Boston Sunday Globe "Fitness Buff Reaches New Heights in a Hurry"
 (2010) Reuters, "Upper Dolpa"
 (2010) Associated Press, "Tibet Border at Humla", Nepal
 (2010) BBC 
 (2010) Experience Life Magazine
 (2011) Outside Magazine "It Keeps You Running"
 (2011) Men's Running U.K. "On Top of the World"
 (2011) Men's Fitness "MF Back Story, Sean Burch"
 (2011) Virginia Living Magazine 
 (2012) Library of AP Photographs
 (2014) The Virginian-Pilot
 (2016) CNN
 (2016) Deccan Herald
 (2017) WTOP
 (2019) Virginia Living Magazine 
 (2022) Warrenton Lifestyle Magazine

Philanthropy
Burch works with charities, organizations, and campaigns supporting environmental rights, wilderness preservation, cancer prevention, and health and community development within impoverished and remote areas of human habitation in Nepal. He has collaborated and partnered with The Nepal Trust, the World Wildlife Fund, Love Hope Strength Foundation, ASK Childhood Cancer Foundation, Fujisan Club of Japan, No Kid Hungry and the Himalayan Rescue Association.  He has given presentations on global warming for organizations including The Explorers Club.
Burch is an on-going Partner with the National Forest Foundation, PHIT America, and  America Nepal Society.

Awards
U.S. Goodwill Ambassador to Nepal by Nepal Government
Joint House Resolution #218 - Virginia State Assembly Honoring 1st Virginian to Summit Mount Everest
Commendation – Virginia House of Delegates Honoring World Record Ascent of Mount Kilimanjaro
Mongolian National Mountaineering Federation Distinguished Achievement - record most 1st Ascents in Mongolia
Brand Personality of the Year – Asia Pacific Brands Foundation
"Year’s Best” Nomination – National Geographic Adventure
The Record Book, "This Year's Greatest Feat" - Men's Journal
Adventure Athlete of the Year - Blue Ridge Outdoors Magazine
Gold ADDY Award - Photographer, Roanoke College Magazine Cover
Gold Medal from King of Nepal for solo summit of Mount Everest

References

 Men's Fitness, April 2011, Error
 Explore's Web, October 11, 2010, 
 Mt. Fuji Winter Ascent, Mens Running Magazine UK
 Interview, Mt. Everest, #2, CNN
 Great Himalaya Trail World Record Expedition, Interview 2, National Geographic Radio
 Great Himalaya Trail World Record Expedition, Interview 1, National Geographic Radio

External links
 
 Hyperfitness:  12 Weeks to Reaching Your Inner Everest and Getting into the Best Shape of Your Life (Penguin Group)

American male marathon runners
1977 births
American motivational speakers
People from Washington, D.C.
Living people